Parapercis okamurai, the yellow sandperch, is a fish species in the sandperch family, Pinguipedidae. It is found in Taiwan and Japan. This species can reach a length of  TL.

Etymology
The fish is named in honor of Osama Okamura, of Kyoto University in Japan, who helped collect the type specimen with fellow graduate student Kunio Amaoka.

References

Masuda, H., K. Amaoka, C. Araga, T. Uyeno and T. Yoshino, 1984. The fishes of the Japanese Archipelago. Vol. 1. Tokai University Press, Tokyo, Japan. 437 p.

Pinguipedidae
Taxa named by Toshiji Kamohara
Fish described in 1960